Raw Silk is a 1988 Australian film directed by Greg Dee. The plot concerns two barristers.

References

External links

Australian crime drama films
1988 films
1980s English-language films
1980s Australian films